The 2022 Texas State Bobcats baseball team represented Texas State University during the 2022 NCAA Division I baseball season. The Bobcats played their home games at Bobcat Ballpark and were led by third-year head coach Steven Trout. They were members of the Sun Belt Conference.

Preseason

Signing Day Recruits

Sun Belt Conference Coaches Poll
The Sun Belt Conference Coaches Poll was released on February 9, 2022. Texas State was picked to finish seventh with 71 votes.

Preseason All-Sun Belt Team & Honors
No players were chosen from the Bobcats.

Personnel

Schedule and results

Schedule Source:
*Rankings are based on the team's current ranking in the D1Baseball poll.

Stanford Regional

Postseason

Rankings

References

Texas State
Texas State Bobcats baseball seasons
Texas State Bobcats baseball
Texas State